This is a list of settlements in the Pieria regional unit, Greece.

 Agiannis
 Agia Varvara
 Agios Dimitrios, Katerini
 Agios Dimitrios, Dio-Olympos
 Agios Spyridonas
 Aiginio
 Alonia
 Alyki
 Andromachi
 Ano Agios Ioannis
 Ano Milia
 Aronas
 Dion 
 Elafos
 Elatochori
 Exochi
 Foteina
 Fteri
 Ganochora
 Kallithea
 Kalyvia Varikou
 Karitsa
 Karyes
 Kastania
 Katachas
 Katalonia
 Katerini
 Kato Agios Ioannis
 Kato Milia
 Kitros
 Kolindros
 Kondariotissa
 Korinos
 Koukkos
 Lagorrachi
 Leptokarya
 Limenas Litochorou
 Litochoro
 Livadi
 Lofos
 Makrygialos
 Megali Gefyra
 Meliadi
 Mesaia Milia
 Methoni
 Mikri Milia
 Milia
 Moschochori
 Moschopotamos
 Nea Agathoupoli
 Nea Chrani
 Nea Efesos
 Nea Trapezounta
 Neo Keramidi
 Neoi Poroi
 Neos Panteleimonas
 Neokaisareia
 Olympiaki Akti
 Palaio Eleftherochori
 Palaio Keramidi
 Palaiostani
 Paliampela
 Plaka
 Palaios Panteleimonas
 Palioi Poroi
 Paralia
 Paralia Korinou
 Paralia Panteleimonos
 Paralia Skotinas
 Peristasi
 Platamon
 Platanakia
 Prosilio
 Pydna
 Rachi
 Ritini
 Ryakia
 Sevasti
 Sfendami
 Skoteina
 Skotina
 Svoronos
 Toxo
 Trilofos
 Vria
 Vrontou

By municipality

See also
Slavic toponyms of places in Pieria Prefecture
List of towns and villages in Greece

 
Pieria